Selected Ambient Works 85–92 is the debut studio album by Aphex Twin, the pseudonym of British electronic musician Richard D. James. It was released on 9 November 1992 through Apollo Records, a subsidiary of Belgian label R&S Records. The album consists of ambient techno tracks recorded onto cassette reputedly dating as far back as 1985, when James was thirteen to fourteen years old. Upon release it received widespread acclaim. It entered the Dance Albums Chart at No. 6 on 26 December 1992.

In 2012, Selected Ambient Works 85–92 was named the greatest album of the 1990s by Fact. It re-entered the dance chart just after the release of Aphex Twin's 2014 album Syro. James followed up the album in 1994 with the more traditionally ambient Selected Ambient Works Volume II.

Background
James began experimenting with musical instruments, such as his family's piano, at an early age. He subsequently created music using a ZX Spectrum and a sampler, and also began reassembling and modifying his own synthesizers. James said he composed ambient music the following year. In an interview with Q magazine in 2014, James stated that the ambient track 'i' emerged from those early recordings. As a teenager James gained a cult following as a DJ at the Shire Horse Inn in St Ives, with Tom Middleton at the Bowgie Inn in Crantock and on the beaches around Cornwall. He studied at Cornwall College from 1988 to 1990 for a National Diploma in engineering. About his studies, he said  "music and electronics went hand in hand".

James' first release, under the alias Aphex Twin, was the 1991 12-inch EP Analogue Bubblebath on Mighty Force Records. In 1991, James and Grant Wilson-Claridge founded Rephlex Records to promote "innovation in the dynamics of acid — a much-loved and misunderstood genre of house music forgotten by some and indeed new to others, especially in Britain". He wrote "Digeridoo" to clear up his audience after a rave. Although he moved to London to take an electronics course at Kingston Polytechnic, he admitted to David Toop that his electronics studies were being abandoned as he pursued a career in the techno genre. While performing at clubs and with a small underground following, James went on to release SAW 85–92, which was mostly recorded before he started DJing and consisted of instrumental songs that were mostly beat-oriented. James later stated that the songs on his debut "were just tracks that my mates [selected], ones that they like to chill out to."

Music

Selected Ambient Works was reputedly recorded between 1985 and 1992 (beginning when James was fourteen) using homemade equipment constructed from standard synthesisers, as well as drum machines. The recording's sound quality has been described as poor due to it being recorded onto a cassette damaged by a cat.

AllMusic noted that the album draws from the club rhythms of techno and acid house, but adds melodic elements "of great subtlety, beauty, and atmospheric texture." DJ Mag noted its synthesis of elements from techno, house, hip-hop, hardcore, and ambient, describing the album as a "somnambulist dreamscape that melted heavenly shoe-gaze melodies into slow-burn beats and ice-clear techno, often with a suggestion of menace lurking at the peripheries." Record Collector stated that the album "demonstrated a mysterious, calmer side" of James' music in contrast to his abrasive earlier releases, calling attention to the presence of "unearthly, gorgeous melodies" on much of the album. Barney Hoskyns noted that the album demonstrates a "schizoid mix of sonic assault and melodic melancholia". Rolling Stone described the album as "fusing lush soundscapes with oceanic beats and bass lines." Jon Savage stated that the album "trashed the boundaries between acid, techno, ambient, and psychedelic." 

Pitchfork stated that "despite the simplicity of his equipment and approach, the songs here are both interesting and varied, ranging from the dancefloor-friendly beats of 'Pulsewidth' to the industrial clanks and whirs of 'Green Calx.'" DJ Mag noted that the "fuzzy melodies and blurred female vocal" of opening track “Xtal” places the track "in a zone similar to contemporaneous shoegaze artists Seefeel and My Bloody Valentine (albeit with the guitars stripped out)." Dayal wrote that "Ageispolis" progresses in a "grand, cinematic sweep". Simon Reynolds described its melody as "Satie-esque", upon an "incongruously strident, unrelenting beat". "Tha" features a "murk[y]" beat and "underwater" sound according to Dayal. Slant noted the use of "diffusive synth chords" throughout the album, and called attention to James' "pop sensibility" on tracks such as "Pulsewidth" and "Ptolemy." 

Various tracks utilise samples: "We Are the Music Makers" features Gene Wilder's recitation of "We are the music makers, and we are the dreamers of dreams" from Arthur O'Shaughnessy's poem Ode, from the 1971 film Willy Wonka & the Chocolate Factory. "Green Calx" contains samples from the 1987 film RoboCop and from the 1978 track "Fodderstompf" by Public Image Ltd, as well as distortion of the opening titles of John Carpenter's 1982 film The Thing.

Artwork
The album's sleeve prominently displays the Aphex Twin symbol, designed by Paul Nicholson who was also a stage dancer at several of James' live gigs around this period. Nicholson stated that the duo's intention for the logo was to be an "amorphic and soft" form with "no sharp lines". According to James, it was a collaborative effort: "He designed it all but I was guiding, like "nah more like this, yeah more like that" etc. [It was] my idea to put the circle around it. There were quite a few iterations before I was happy. I was also astute enough to buy the rights off him, with my last £'s, I was still a student, as I knew it would be very important to me and I also didn't want any arguments down the road." James also suggested that it represented a sigil.

Release
Selected Ambient Works 85–92 was released on 9 November 1992 by Apollo, a subdivision of Belgian record label R&S Records. It was initially only available in the UK via import because a licensing deal between R&S and Outer Rhythm had collapsed earlier in the year. The album was the first record released by R&S in the UK when it started its own operations in the country instead of licensing their releases to another label. James departed from R&S Records after the album's release as he had signed to Warp Records and also wished to focus on his label Rephlex.

Reception and legacy

Selected Ambient Works 85–92 received critical acclaim and almost immediately acquired a "huge underground reputation". Andrew Smith, reviewing the album in Melody Maker two weeks after its release, wrote: "Not since Kraftwerk has an artist understood texture in this way, made electronic music sound so organic and resonant, so full of life". Simon Reynolds, writing in Melody Maker at the end of 1993, called the album "the most sheerly beautiful album of '93 [and] also the most significant," arguing that it "gave credibility to the then emergent genre of ambient techno" and "singlehandedly won over many indie fans who hadn't really listened to much techno, thus encouraging them to seek out more."
 
John Bush of AllMusic described the album as "one of the indisputable classics of electronica, and a defining document for ambient music in particular." Reviewing the album after its 2002 reissue, Rolling Stone'''s Pat Blashill called it a "gorgeous, ethereal album" in which James "proved that techno could be more than druggy dance music." David M. Pecoraro of Pitchfork noted "the creeping basslines, the constantly mutating drum patterns, the synth tones which moved with all the grace and fluidity of a professional dancer," describing the album as "among the most interesting music ever created with a keyboard and a computer" despite its "primitive origins". In 2012, Reynolds wrote that the album "infuses everyday life with a perpetual first flush of spring." Peter Manning, in his book Electronic and Computer Music, noted that James, upon the release of 85–92, "managed finally to elevate [electronic music's] status to the mainstream consciousness of the general public". The album expanded the scope of ambient music and, according to Savage, "defined a new techno primitive romanticism".

In 2003, the album was placed number 92 in NMEs "100 Best Albums" poll. The album was also featured in the book 1001 Albums You Must Hear Before You Die. AllMusic called it "a masterpiece of ambient techno" and a "work of brilliance". In 2012, Fact named it the greatest album of the 1990s. In 2017, Pitchfork named it the best IDM album of all time.

Track listing

Personnel
Credits adapted from Selected Ambient Works 85–92'' liner notes.

 Richard D. James – writing, production, electronics, sampler

Charts

Certifications

References

Sources

Notes

External links
 

Aphex Twin albums
1992 debut albums
Ambient techno albums
R&S Records albums